S180 is a murine Sarcoma cancer cell line. It has been commonly used in cancer research due to its rapid growth and proliferation in mice. The cell line was initially harvested from a soft tissue tumor in a Swiss mouse.

References

External links
Cellosaurus entry for S180

Rodent cell lines